Haridevpur is a region of South Kolkata of the state of West Bengal, India. The area is situated off the Mahatma Gandhi Road and is a part of Behala Purba and Tollygunge assembly constituency.

Geography
Haridevpur borders Thakurpukur and Joka in West, Tollygunge in East, Behala and New Alipore in North, Greater Bansdroni and Nepalgunge in south.

Police district
Haridevpur police station is part of the South West division of Kolkata Police. It is located at 559 Mahatma Gandhi Road, Kolkata-700082.

Behala Women police station, located at the same address as above, covers all police districts under the jurisdiction of the South West division i.e. Sarsuna, Taratala, Behala, Parnasree, Thakurpukur and Haridevpur.

Jadavpur, Thakurpukur, Behala, Purba Jadavpur, Tiljala, Regent Park, Metiabruz, Nadial and Kasba police stations were transferred from South 24 Parganas to Kolkata in 2011. Except Metiabruz, all the police stations were split into two. The new police stations are Parnasree, Haridevpur, Garfa, Patuli, Survey Park, Pragati Maidan, Bansdroni and Rajabagan.

Transport
Haridevpur is on Mahatma Gandhi Road linking Thakurpukur and Joka with Tollygunge.

Bus

Private Bus
 40A Julpia - Babughat
 40B Thakurpukur - Babughat
 12C/1B Pailan - Howrah Station

Mini Bus
 S117 Kalitala - Howrah Station

WBTC Bus
 C8 Joka - Barasat
 M16A Thakurpukur - Tollygunge
 S4C Haridevpur - Howrah Station
 AC4B Joka - New Town Bus Stand

References

External links

Neighbourhoods in Kolkata